Rüdesheim is the name of the following places:

Rüdesheim am Rhein in Hesse, Germany
Rüdesheim (Rhein) station, in Rüdesheim am Rhein
Rüdesheim an der Nahe in Rhineland-Palatinate, Germany
Rüdesheim (Verbandsgemeinde), a collective municipality in Bad Kreuznach, Rhineland-Palatinate, Germany